JWH-116 is a synthetic cannabinoid receptor ligand from the naphthoylindole family. It is the indole 2-ethyl derivative of related compound JWH-018. The binding affinity of JWH-116 for the CB1 receptor is reported as Ki = 52 ± 5 nM.

In the United States, all CB1 receptor agonists of the 3-(1-naphthoyl)indole class such as JWH-116 are Schedule I Controlled Substances.

See also 

 JWH-018
 JWH-081

References 

JWH cannabinoids
Naphthoylindoles
Designer drugs
CB1 receptor agonists